The FC Basel 1935–36 season was the forty-third season since the club's foundation on 15 November 1893. FC Basel played their home games in the Landhof in the district Wettstein in Kleinbasel. Franz Rinderer was again voted as the club chairman and this was his fifth consecutive season as club president.

Overview 
Alwin Riemke was appointed as new team manager. He followed Richard (Dombi) Kohn who had moved on to manage Feyenoord. Riemke came from Lausanne-Sport, who had won the double in the previous Nationalliga championship season and the Cup. Riemke acted as player-manager and played four matches during the season. Basel played a total of 38 matches in their 1935–36 season. 26 of these matches were in the Nationalliga, one in the Swiss Cup and 11 were friendly matches. Of these 11 friendlies six were played at home and the others all in Switzerland. Interesting visitors to the Landhof were the French teams Mulhouse, Excelsior AC Roubaix and Olympique Lillois, the Hungarian teams MTK Budapest and Budapest Honvéd and the Austrian team Wiener AC. Of theses 11 friendly matches seven ended with a victory, one was drawn and three ended in a defeat.

The 1935–36 Nationalliga was contested by 14 teams and was played in a double round robin. Basel played a very mediocre season and ended the championship in 10th position. They won just eight of their 26 games and with 20 points ended the season 21 points behind Lausanne-Sport who won the championship for the second consecutive season. Josef Artimovicz was Basel's top scorer with 14 goals, Jaeck second best scorer with 9 goals.

In the 1st principal round of the Swiss Cup Basel were drawn at home in the Landhof against lower tier Luzern. But they were defeated and thus knocked out. Young Fellows Zürich won the cup.

Players 
The following is the list of the Basel first team squad during the season 1935–36. The list includes players that were in the squad the day the season started on 3 August 1935 but subsequently left the club after that date.

 
 

 

Players who left the squad

Results

Legend

Friendly matches

Pre-season

Mid-season

Nationalliga

League matches

League table

Swiss Cup

See also 
 History of FC Basel
 List of FC Basel players
 List of FC Basel seasons

References

Sources 
 Rotblau: Jahrbuch Saison 2014/2015. Publisher: FC Basel Marketing AG. 
 Die ersten 125 Jahre. Publisher: Josef Zindel im Friedrich Reinhardt Verlag, Basel. 
 FCB team 1935/36 at fcb-archiv.ch
 Switzerland 1935/36 by Erik Garin at Rec.Sport.Soccer Statistics Foundation

External links
 FC Basel official site

FC Basel seasons
Basel